Carol Harris-Shapiro is a lecturer at Temple University in the Intellectual Heritage Department.  She has written a controversial book on Messianic Judaism, a belief system considered by most Christians and Jews to be a form of Christianity, adhered to by groups that seek to combine Christianity and Judaism.

She received her rabbinical ordination at the Reconstructionist Rabbinical College in 1988, and religiously affiliates with Reconstructionist Judaism.  She received a Ph.D. in religion from Temple University in 1992. In the past she has taught at Villanova University, La Salle University, Philadelphia University, Rosemont College, and Gratz College.

She looks at religion from a sociological standpoint, and sees that although Jewish community as a whole accepts Secular Humanistic Jews and Jewish Buddhists as still being "in the fold," Messianic Jews are considered to be heretics.  It was this puzzle in the behavior of the Jewish community—accepting atheist and Buddhist Jews, while rejecting Jews practicing Christianity—that led her to explore the Messianic Jewish community in a focused ethnographic study and to think through the issue of legitimacy surrounding Messianic Judaism.

Book controversy

Her book Messianic Judaism: A Rabbi's Journey through Religious Change in America has been the focus of a controversy.  She concludes that given the Jewish community's tacit acceptance of other seemingly "heretical" Jews as part of the ethnic Jewish community, it would be difficult to find a consistently logical reason to reject Messianic Judaism, although she is quite clear that communities can draw boundaries as they see fit.  Theologically, she affirms that Messianic Jews are adherents of Evangelical Christianity.

This was reiterated in an interview with World: The Journal of the Unitarian Universalist Association (Nov/Dec 99), Harris-Shapiro reiterates that she views messianic Judaism as a form of Christianity.

World: Describe the Christianity practiced by Messianic Jews and in particular their appropriation of Jesus.

CHS: They practice evangelical Christianity. Like evangelical Christians, they believe Jesus was both God and man, came to earth, died for our sins, was resurrected on the third day, performed the miracles, and that the New Testament is literally true. Some also hold some fundamentalist beliefs about exactly how one interprets the New Testament. Some are very interested in the millennium, in prophecy, in when or if the rapture is going to happen. Many congregations, though not all, are Pentecostal—that is, they believe in gifts of the spirit such as speaking in tongues, charismatic healing, exorcising demons, and the real presence of Satan that has to be battled.

As for how they see Jesus, that's interesting. Although they accept the theological doctrine that Jesus is both God and human, they don't pray to him. They don't feel comfortable with that. Some Messianic rabbis have even had difficulty accepting Yeshua as God and have been kicked out of the movement.

The idea that "messianic Judaism" could be considered a form of Judaism has been rejected by the overwhelming majority of Jewish historians and rabbis. Reform Rabbi Eric Yoffie, president of the Union of American Hebrew Congregations called her conclusions absurd, writing that "there's no such thing as a 'messianic Jew.' The whole notion is a fraud.…There will be no compromise on that point." In the same newspaper article on this book, Conservative Rabbi Jerome Epstein, vice president of the United Synagogue of Conservative Judaism and Orthodox Rabbi Lawrence Shiffman, professor of Judaic Studies at New York University also stated that Harris-Shapiro was egregiously incorrect. Shiffman wrote that she "has been sucked into the very conception the missionaries want to create." (Kessler, E. J. The Jewish Forward, June 4, 1999: page 1).

See also
Dan Cohn-Sherbok

Bibliography
 Messianic Judaism: A Rabbi's Journey through Religious Change in America Beacon Press, 1999
 "Sectarian Schooling and Civic Responsibility: 'Social Capital' in American Jewish Day Schools," in Public Education, Democracy and the Common Good (2004), Phi Delta Kappa Press, pp. 141–153.
 "Union of Messianic Jewish Congregations," pp. 1340–1341, in Religions of the World, Vol. 4, ed. J. Gordon Melton and Martin Baumann. Santa Barbara, CA: ABC Clio, 2002.
 "Academic Approaches to Teaching Jewish Studies." Review. Journal of Ecumenical Studies, Winter 2000, 84–85.
 "Sanctifying Relations: American Jews, African-Americans and the Passover Seder" at the AAR Boston, November 1999.
 "'Christian' is a Four-Letter Word: The Construction of Messianic Jewish Identity" at the AAR, November 1997.
 "Double Resistance to the Jewish/Christian Division: The Case of Messianic Judaism" at the Mid-Atlantic Region American Academy of Religion Conference, March 1997.
 "Messianic Jews as Mirror," Reconstructionist, Fall 1994, 36–43.
 "Gender Healing in Messianic Judaism," and "Heteroglossic Identity in Messianic Judaism" at the Pacific Northwest Regional AAR, April 1994.

References 
 David Reich, "A Tempest in the Rabbinate: An Interview with Carol Harris-Shapiro" in World: The Journal of the Unitarian Universalist Association November/December 1999

American Reconstructionist rabbis
Jewish American writers
Reconstructionist women rabbis
Temple University faculty
Year of birth missing (living people)
Living people
Villanova University faculty
Reconstructionist Rabbinical College alumni
Temple University alumni
Thomas Jefferson University faculty
Gratz College
21st-century American Jews